The 2016 CAMS Australian Formula 4 Championship is the second Australian Formula 4 Championship, a motor racing competition for open-wheel racing cars complying with Formula 4 regulations, which were created by the Fédération Internationale de l'Automobile (FIA) for entry-level open-wheel championships. Teams and drivers are competing in eighteen races at six venues, starting on 1 April and ending on 23 October.

Teams and drivers
The following Australian-registered teams and drivers contested the championship.

Race calendar and results
The calendar expanded for the 2016 season, with the Confederation of Australian Motor Sport choosing to focus on permanent racing venues, rather than temporary street circuits, to better aid the development of young drivers. The season started earlier in the year than in 2015, with the first round at Symmons Plains Raceway in April, while the final round will be held at the Highlands Motorsport Park in New Zealand. The Townsville Street Circuit and Homebush Street Circuit have been removed from the schedule. On February 9, it was announced that Highlands Motorsport Park would be removed from the schedule for cost reasons.

All rounds will support the International V8 Supercars Championship, with the exception of the third round that will be featured within the Shannons Nationals.

Championship standings
Points are awarded to the top 10 classified finishers in each race.

Drivers' standings

References

External links

Australian F4 Championship seasons
Australian
F4 Championship
Australian Formula 4